is a Japanese voice actor represented by Vi-vo. He is known for providing the voice of the video game character Terry Bogard, which he has done since 2016, starting with The King of Fighters XIV. He also voices the characters Faust and Potemkin from the Guilty Gear fighting game series.

Filmography

Television animation

2001
Beyblade as Miguel
Captain Tsubasa (2001 version) as Pepe
The Prince of Tennis as Shiratama

2003
Inuyasha as Kisuke (episode 129)
Dear Boys as Tōya Takashina
Scrapped Princess as Leopold Scorpus

2004
Initial D: Fourth Stage as Saiyu

2005
Black Cat as Train Heartnet
Glass Mask as Hasegawa (episode 19-22)
Ichigo 100% as Okusa

2006
Chocotto Sister as Awara (episode 3)
Himawari! as Yonezawa
Katekyo Hitman Reborn! as Kyoya Hibari, Fon, Alaudi
Red Garden as JC
Spider Riders as Shadow

2007
Bleach as Di Roy Linker
Gurren Lagann as Kidd
Heroic Age as Iolaus Oz Nahilm
Shining Tears X Wind as Killrain

2008
Slap-up Party: Arad Senki as Baron Abel
Tytania as Ariabart Tytania
Zettai Karen Children as Bullet

2009
Naruto: Shippuden as Suigetsu Hozuki, Shin, Urushi
Student Council's Discretion as Ken Sugisaki
Bleach (TV series) as Findor Carias

2010
Fairy Tail as Hibiki Lates
Ichiban Ushiro no Dai Maō as Akuto Sai

2011
Croisée in a Foreign Labyrinth as Claude Claudel
Pretty Rhythm Aurora Dream as Sho
Sekai-ichi Hatsukoi as Ritsu Onodera
Sekai-ichi Hatsukoi 2 as Ritsu Onodera

2012
Pretty Rhythm: Dear My Future as Sho

2013
Diabolik Lovers as Sakamaki Subaru
Hetalia Beautiful World as Protagonist (episode 5)
Leviathan The Last Defense as Leviathan's brother
My Teen Romantic Comedy SNAFU as Hayato Hayama
Ace of Diamond as Nagao Akira

2014
Lady Jewelpet as Prince Romeo
The Kawai Complex Guide to Manors and Hostel Behavior as Kurokawa
Fairy Tail as Hibiki Lates

2015
My Teen Romantic Comedy SNAFU Too! as Hayato Hayama
Dance with Devils as Sogami Urie
Diabolik Lovers More, Blood as Sakamaki Subaru

2016
Ooya-san wa Shishunki! as Maeda
91 Days as Avilio Bruno
Naruto Shippuden as Indra Otsutsuki
Scared Rider Xechs as Yuji Tsuga
Tsukiuta. The Animation as Yoru Nagatsuki
Touken Ranbu: Hanamaru as Kogitsunemaru

2017
Kirakira PreCure a la Mode as Grocery Shop Owner
ēlDLIVE as Ken Mizoguchi
Kenka Bancho Otome: Girl Beats Boys as Haruo Sakaguchi
Katsugeki/Touken Ranbu as Kogitsunemaru

2018
Touken Ranbu: Hanamaru 2 as Kogitsunemaru

2019
Ao-chan Can't Study! as Sōichirō Yabe
Kengan Ashura as Mitsuyo Kureishi

2020
ID - Invaded as Shiratake
Tsukiuta. The Animation 2 as Yoru Nagatsuki
My Teen Romantic Comedy SNAFU Climax as Hayato Hayama

2021
I-Chu: Halfway Through the Idol as Mutsuki Kururugi
Dragon Goes House-Hunting as Huey
Backflip!! as Keisuke Tsukidate
IDOLiSH7: Third Beat! as Mido Torao

2022
Trapped in a Dating Sim: The World of Otome Games is Tough for Mobs as Dan Fia Elgar

2023
Junji Ito Maniac: Japanese Tales of the Macabre as Shimada (Headless statue)

Movies
Bleach: Memories of Nobody as Mue
Gurren Lagann The Movie: Childhood's End as Kidd
Legend of the Millennium Dragon as Raiko
Sekai-ichi Hatsukoi: Yokozawa Takafumi no Baai as Ritsu Onodera
Dance with Devils: Fortuna as Urie Sogami
Mobile Suit Gundam: Cucuruz Doan's Island as Job John
Backflip!! as Keisuke Tsukidate

Original net animation
The King of Fighters: Destiny (–18) as Terry Bogard

Video games
Aiyoku no Eustia as Caim Astraea
Arknights as Executor
BlazBlue: Cross Tag Battle as Carmine
Blackstar -Theater Starless as Kokuyou
Bravely Default: Brilliant Lights as Rufus
Castlevania Judgment as Ralph Belmondo
Dawn of Mana as Stroud Lorimar
Diabolik Lovers as Sakamaki Subaru
Fairy Fencer F: Refrain Chord as All
Fighting EX Layer as Terry Bogard
Granblue Fantasy as Nehan
Galaxy Angel II Mugen Kairou no Kagi as Roselle Mateus
Galaxy Angel II Eigou Kaiki no Toki as Roselle Mateus
Garnet Cradle as Teshigawara Touya
Guilty Gear series as Faust, Potemkin
Hakuouki as Miki Saburo
IDOLiSH7 as Mido Torao
Inuyasha: The Secret of the Cursed Mask as Michiru Kururugi
I-Chu as Mutsuki Kururugi
Katekyo Hitman Reborn! Battle Arena as Hibari Kyoya
Liar! Uncover The Truth as Itaru Yuikawa 
Mahōtsukai no Yakusoku as Oz
Naruto Shippūden: Narutimate Accel 3 as Suigetsu Hozuki
Omerta Chinmoku no Okite as Kiryuu Reiji
Record of Agarest War as Leonhardt, Rex
Sacred Blaze as Alecseed
Skullgirls as Samson
Sonic Forces as Infinite
Starry Sky in Summer as Shiratori Yahiko
Super Robot Wars Z as Toby Watson
Super Smash Bros. Ultimate as Terry Bogard
Suto*Mani: Strobe*Mania as Masamune Kiryu
S.Y.K as Suoh/RanFan
Tales of Xillia 2 as Ludger Will Kresnik, Victor
The King of Fighters XIV as Terry Bogard
The King of Fighters XV as Terry Bogard
The King of Fighters All Star as Terry Bogard
The King of Fighters for Girls as Terry Bogard
Touken Ranbu as Kogitsunemaru
Trinity Universe as Suzaku
Tsukino Paradise (TsukiPara) as Nagatsuki Yoru
Under Night In-Birth: Exe Late as Carmine
Helios Rising Heroes (2020) as Will Sprout

Drama CDs
 Seventh Heaven as Yuuri
 Alice=Alice as Kuro Usagi
 Candy Color Paradox as Satoshi Onoe
 Beauty & Ghost as Kota Sakaki
 Boku no Koi no Hanashi Himegoto as Kazui Umehara
 Crimson Spell as Valdrigr (Val) Areswies
  Dateless Love  as Yoshinobu 'Keiki' Tokugawa 
 Diabolik Lovers as Subaru Sakamaki
 Flutter as Ryousuke Mizuki
 Hanakage as Kirishima Iori
 Hana Wa Saku Ka as Minagawa Youichi
 Koi no Shizuku as Maya Shibasaki
 Kuroneko Kareshi no Asobikata as Shingo
 Leopard Hakusho as Aya Hyoudou
 Mo Dao Zu Shi/Ma Dou So Shi as Xue Yang/Setsu You
 Otona Keikenchi as Shinkai Seiji
 Sekai-ichi Hatsukoi as Onodera Ritsu
 Sentimental Garden Lover as Fuji
 Thanatos no Futago as Mihail Aramovich Khromushin
 Touch Me Again as Eisuke
 Twinkle Stars as Chihiro Aoi
 Oz to Himitsu no Ai as Chikage

Dubbing

Live-action
The 51st State as Omar (Ade)
Bon Cop, Bad Cop as Jonathan (Erik Knudsen)
Bones as Lance Sweets (John Francis Daley)
Dunkirk as Collins (Jack Lowden)
Eureka as Douglas Fargo (Neil Grayston)
Final Destination 5 as Peter Friedkin (Miles Fisher)
Flags of Our Fathers as Ed Block (Benjamin Walker)
Heroes as Narrator/Mohinder Suresh (Sendhil Ramamurthy)
The Kill Team as Sergeant Deeks (Alexander Skarsgård)
The Libertine as Billy Downs (Rupert Friend)
Live from Baghdad as Eason Jordan
Love, Simon as Simon Spier (Nick Robinson)
Pan Am as Dean Lowrey (Mike Vogel)
Pray for Morning as Dylan
Project Runway as Daniel Vosovic
Shooter as Dave Simmons
Their Finest as Tom Buckley (Sam Claflin)
True Blood as Eric Northman (Alexander Skarsgård)
Ugly Betty as Marc St. James (Michael Urie)
Uncertainty as Bobby (Joseph Gordon-Levitt)
Veronica Mars as Eli "Weevil" Navarro (Francis Capra)

Animation
Batman: The Brave and the Bold as Brother Eye
Turbo as Skidmark

References

External links 
Official agency profile 

1979 births
Living people
Japanese male video game actors
Japanese male voice actors
People from Okazaki, Aichi
Male voice actors from Aichi Prefecture
20th-century Japanese male actors
21st-century Japanese male actors